I Am Not Salvador is a 2016 Iranian-Brazilian film directed by Manouchehr Hadi and produced by Seyed Amir Parvin Hosseini and Mansour Sohrabpour, starring Reza Attaran, Yekta Naser, Amir Arsalan Alebouyeh, Carol Vidotti and Rivaldoller.

Plot
Naser and his family are invited on a journey to Brazil by Dream Vacation Agency. Angel, a Brazilian girl is confused by Naser because she thinks that Naser is her missing husband, Salvador.

Cast
 Reza Attaran as Naser Izadi / Salvador
 Yekta Naser as Elham / Naser's Wife 
 Amir Arsalan AleBouyeh as Mohammad 
 Carol Vidotti as Angel
 Mehdi Mehrabi as Siyamak Parvin
 Sogol Mehrabi as Sogol / Izadi's daughter 
 Barry Fiocca as Angel's grandmother 
 Rivaldo as himself 
 Zhila Sadeghi as herself

References

External links
 

2016 films
Iranian comedy-drama films
Brazilian comedy-drama films
Films set in Brazil